Thomas Parsons (January 7, 1814 Chieveley, Berkshire, England – February 10, 1873 Rochester, Monroe County, New York) was an American politician from New York.

Life
Parsons attended the common schools and then became a shepherd. In 1832, he emigrated to the United States, and worked as a farm-hand in Wheatland. Four years later, he removed to Rochester where he engaged in the lumber trade and established sawmills.

An alderman of Rochester from 1851 to 1854, and in 1857 and 1858, Parsons was a Democratic member of the New York State Assembly (Monroe Co., 2nd D.) in 1858. He was then a Republican member of the New York State Senate (28th D.) in 1866 and 1867.

Parsons was buried at the Mount Hope Cemetery, Rochester. State Senator Cornelius R. Parsons (1842–1901) was his son.

Sources
 The New York Civil List compiled by Franklin Benjamin Hough, Stephen C. Hutchins and Edgar Albert Werner (1870; pg. 444 and 487)
 Life Sketches of the State Officers, Senators, and Members of the Assembly of the State of New York, in 1867 by S. R. Harlow & H. H. Boone (pg. 133ff)
 Horrible Railroad Accident at Rochester; ...Mr. James Parsons, brother of Ex-Alderman Thomas Parsons, ...was struck down by the locomotive... in NYT on November 16, 1855
 BY MAIL AND TELEGRAPH; Hon. Thomas Parsons...died yesterday morning... in NYT on February 11, 1873
 DEATH OF HON. THOMAS PARSONS in the ''Rochester Union and Advertiser on February 10, 1873, transcribed at RootsWeb

External links

1814 births
1873 deaths
New York (state) state senators
Politicians from Rochester, New York
New York (state) Democrats
Members of the New York State Assembly
People from Chieveley
New York (state) Republicans
Burials at Mount Hope Cemetery (Rochester)
19th-century American politicians